25D may refer to:

 25D/Neujmin, a periodic comet in the solar system
 Learjet 25D
 New York State Route 25D
 25d, a model of the BMW X1 (E84) automobile